Albert Parish located at 32°00'54.0"S 141°08'29.0"E is a remote rural locality, and cadastral Parish of Yancowinna County, far western New South Wales. The parish is on the Barrier Highway midway between Broken Hill, New South Wales and Cockburn on the South Australian border.

The landscape is arid, sparsely vegetated with rolling treeless hills and has a Köppen climate classification of BWk desert.

Location
Albert Parish is on the Barrier Highway, main Sydney to Adelaide railway line.  
The topography is flat and sparsely vegetated. Albert Parish, New South Wales is part of the traditional lands of the Wiljali people.

See also
 Albert, New South Wales
 Lake Albert, New South Wales
 Albert Parish (Delialah County), New South Wales
 Albert Parish (Yantara County) New South Wales
 Albert, (Drake County) New South Wales
 Albert, (Kennedy County) New South Wales
 Albert, (Macquarie County) New South Wales
 Albert, (Sandon County) New South Wales
 Albert, (St Vincent County) New South Wales

References

Towns in New South Wales
Far West (New South Wales)